Hirtella physophora is a species of plant in the family Chrysobalanaceae. It forms an association with the ant species, Allomerus decemarticulatus. The ants live in honeycombed cylinders they attach to the plant's stems. The plant nearly always has these ants associated with it.

References

physophora